The Cowan rail accident occurred at 7:20pm on 6 May 1990 when the 3801 Limited special steam passenger train returning from the Morpeth Jazz Festival was struck in the rear by the following CityRail inter-urban passenger service. The steam train had stalled while attempting to climb the steep gradient from the Hawkesbury River to Cowan, New South Wales, and it was found that sand applied to the rails to regain traction had interfered with the signals and given the following train a false clear indication.

Overview 

The railway line at this point, known as the Cowan Bank, is 2.5% (1 in 40) grade and, as the special hauled by steam locomotive 3801 passed southwards through the No. 3 tunnel, the wheels of the locomotive started to slip. The driver of 3801 applied sand to the rails to improve traction, but the train came to a complete stop approximately 50 metres clear of the tunnel. Passengers on the steam train reported seeing a signal fluctuating aspects between green and yellow. The following CityRail V set inter-urban train, which had been halted at the northern entrance to Boronia No. 4 tunnel for 10 minutes by a red stop signal, received a green indication and proceeded, colliding with the steam train shortly after.

The impact killed the driver of the inter-urban train, Gordon Hill, and a passenger who was riding in its cab, as well as four passengers in the rear carriage of 3801's train. The passengers killed were the recently retired Vice Chancellor of the University of Sydney, John Manning Ward, his wife and daughter, and the wife of the University's Registrar. 99 passengers were injured, 11 of those seriously. The force of the crash completely destroyed the last carriage of the steam train, and was enough to break the locomotive coupling and push the engine 12 metres forward.

A subsequent coronial inquiry, headed by NSW State Coroner Derrick Hand, found in December 1990 that the sand that had been applied to the track by 3801 to aid traction had insulated the train from the rails, meaning that the track circuits failed to detect the presence of the first train, allowing the following inter-urban train to be given a false green (clear) aspect (known as a wrong-side failure). Mr Hand also considered it likely that a passenger on 3801 had applied a handbrake on the third carriage, and that this, combined with the heavy load, the steep grade and the curvature of the line, had prevented the steam train from restarting. No fault was found with the signalling system, although the coroner recommended that it be upgraded as soon as possible.

Contributing factors 

Contributing factors include:
 AC track circuits, which are less sensitive at detecting rail vehicles.
 Sand on the rails insulated the train's wheels and prevented the track circuit from detecting it - the train effectively became invisible to the signalling system. 
 The signalling system was two-aspect colour light - a three aspect colour light may have provided the driver of the following train with more warning.
 No sand removal system fitted to 3801.
 No mechanism (at the time) for train-to-train or train-to-signalman communication (communication with signal boxes was only possible by track-side phones).
 It is believed that the handbrakes on one of the carriages may have been applied as a stunt.

Consequences 

 An interim ban was placed on the use of steam locomotives on the NSW railway system. The ban was lifted 9 months later.
 Operators were required to use one State Rail employee on each train
 Operators were required to carry insurance cover of $10 million. The government agreed to underwrite any claims exceeding that amount.

See also
 Glenbrook rail accident

References 

 
 

Railway accidents and incidents in New South Wales
1990 in Australia
Railway accidents in 1990
1990s in New South Wales
Train collisions in Australia
1990 disasters in Australia
May 1990 events in Australia